The 1st Airborne Command Control Squadron is part of the 595th Command and Control Group at Offutt Air Force Base, Nebraska.  It operates the Boeing E-4 aircraft conducting airborne command and control missions.

The squadron is one of the oldest in the United States Air Force, its origins dating to 25 September 1917, when it was organized at Fort Omaha, Nebraska.  It served overseas in France as part of the American Expeditionary Forces during World War I.   The squadron saw combat during World War II, and became part of the Strategic Air Command during the Cold War.

History

World War and Balloon School
The first predecessor of the squadron was organized at Fort Omaha Nebraska in September 1917 as Company A, 2d Balloon Squadron.  Two months later it departed for overseas service on the Western Front (World War I), arriving in France in January 1918.  It entered combat as an observation unit with the French Eighth Army on 19 April 1918, operating observation balloons over the front lines.  Once forces of the American Expeditionary Forces, had built up, it continued to operate as the 1st Balloon Company with the American I Corps until 17 October 1918.  Following the end of the war, it served with III Corps as part of the occupation forces until April 1919.

Interwar years
In the spring of 1919, the squadron returned to the United States and was stationed at Ross Field, California as part of the Air Service Balloon School. In June 1922, the Balloon School moved to Scott Field, Illinois and Ross Field was closed as a military installation.  The squadron was inactivated with the closure of Ross.

The second predecessor of the squadron, also designated the 1st Balloon Company, was activated at Scott in May 1929.  After a brief period of training with the 21st Airship Group at Scott, it moved to Post Field, located on Fort Sill, Oklahoma, where it was assigned to the Field Artillery School. It trained and conducted exercises with the school.  At the beginning of World War II, it operated barrage balloons, but that mission was assigned to the coast artillery and the squadron was disbanded two months after the Japanese attack on Pearl Harbor.

World War II
The third predecessor of the squadron was activated in April 1942 at Long Beach Army Air Base as the 1st Air Corps Ferrying Squadron, the location of a Douglas Aircraft Company manufacturing plant.  It ferried aircraft from the Douglas factory and other factories in the Western Procurement District to overseas departure points. However, the Army Air Forces was finding that standard military units, based on relatively inflexible tables of organization were not well adapted to the training and logistics support mission.  Accordingly, it adopted a more functional system in which each base was organized into a separate numbered unit.
In March 1944, Air Transport Command units assigned to the 6th Ferrying Group were combined into the 556th AAF Base Unit.

Airborne command and control
On 1 June 1962, Headquarters Command organized the 1000th Airborne Command Control Squadron at Andrews Air Force Base to operate the National Emergency Airborne Command Post and assigned it to the 1001st Air Base Wing. By 1965, the squadron was operating Boeing EC-135 aircraft to support this mission. On 1 July 1969, the 1st Airborne Command Control Squadron was activated and assumed the mission, personnel and equipment of the 1000th Squadron.

In 1974, the squadron began to replace its EC-135s with more capable Boeing E-4s, completing the upgrade the following year.  In November 1975, the squadron was reassigned from Andrews' 1st Composite Wing to the 55th Strategic Reconnaissance Wing at Offutt Air Force Base, Nebraska.  On 1 July 1977, it moved to join the 55th Wing at Offutt On 1 October 2016, the unit was reassigned to the newly activated 595th Command and Control Group under the control of Air Force Global Strike Command.

Lineage
 1st Airship Company
 Organized as Company A, 2d Balloon Squadron on 25 September 1917
 Redesignated 1st Balloon Company on 19 June 1918
 Inactivated on 25 July 1922
 Redesignated 1st Airship Company on 24 March 1923
 Consolidated with the 1st Balloon Company as the 1st Balloon Company on 31 July 1929

 1st Balloon Squadron
 Constituted as the 1st Balloon Company on 18 October 1927
 Activated on 17 May 1929
 Consolidated with the 1st Airship Company on 31 July 1929
 Redesignated 1st Balloon Squadron on 1 October 1933
 Disbanded on 6 Feb 1942
 Reconstituted and consolidated with the 1st Ferrying Squadron and the 1st Airborne Command Control Squadron as the 1st Airborne Command Control Squadron on 19 September 1985

 1st Ferrying Squadron
 Constituted as the 1st Air Corps Ferrying Squadron on 18 February 1942
 Activated on 15 April 1942
 Redesignated 1st Ferrying Squadron on 12 May 1943
 Disbanded on 1 April 1944
 Reconstituted and consolidated with the 1st Balloon Squadron and the 1st Airborne Command Control Squadron as the 1st Airborne Command Control Squadron on 19 September 1985

 1st Airborne Command and Control Squadron
 Constituted as the 1st Airborne Command Control Squadron on 9 May 1969
 Activated on 1 July 1969
 Consolidated with the 1st Balloon Squadron and the 1st Ferrying Squadron on 19 September 1985

Assignments

 Unknown, 25 September 1917
 Balloon Wing, I Army Corps, July 1918
 Balloon Group, I Army Corps, 8 October 1918
 Balloon Group, III Army Corps, c. 20 November 1918 – 16 April 1919
 Balloon School, Ross Field, California (later, Air Service Balloon Observers School), July 1919
 Ninth Corps Area, 30 June–25 July 1922
 Sixth Corps Area, 17 May 1929

 Field Artillery School, June 1929
 III Air Support Command (attached to Field Artillery School), 1 September 1941 – 6 February 1942
 California Sector, Air Corps Ferrying Command (later 6th Ferrying Group), 15 April 1942 – 1 April 1944
 1st Composite Wing, 1 July 1969
 55th Strategic Reconnaissance Wing, 1 November 1975
 55th Operations Group, 1 September 1991
 595th Command and Control Group, 1 October 2016

Stations

 Fort Omaha, Nebraska, 25 September 1917
 Garden City, New York, 30 November–7 December 1917
 Camp de Souge, Gironde, France, 3 January 1918
 Brouville, France, 15 April 1918
 Les Ecoliers (near Montreuil-aux-Lions), France, 19 July 1918
 Epaux-Bezu, France, 22 July 1918
 Épieds, France, 25 July 1918
 Artois Ferme (near Courpoil), France, 28 July 1918
 Mareuil-en-Dole, France, 5 August 1918
 Courcelles-sur-Vesle, France, 13 August 1918
 Tremblecourt, France, 23 August 1918
 La Queue de Theinard (near Domevre-en-Haye), France, 29 August 1918
 Bois de Brule (near Neuvilly-en-Argonne), France, 27 September 1918
 Varennes-en-Argonne, France, 2 October 1918

 Chatel-Chehery, France, 11 October 1918
 Auzeville-en-Argonne, France, 17 October 1918
 Mercy-le-Bas, France, 21 November 1918
 Euren, Germany, 8 December 1918
 Niederburg (near Koblenz), Germany, 19 December 1918
 Colombey-les-Belles, France, 17 April 1919
 St Nazaire, France, c. 5 May 1919–c. late May 1919
 Camp Lee, Virginia, c. 6 June 1919
 Ross Field, California, July 1919 – 25 July 1922
 Scott Field, Illinois, 17 May 1929
 Post Field, Oklahoma, 24 June 1929 – 6 February 1942
 Long Beach Army Air Base, California, 15 April 1942 – 1 April 1944
 Andrews Air Force Base, Maryland, 1 July 1969
 Offutt Air Force Base, Nebraska, 1 July 1977 – present

Aircraft and Balloons

 Type R Observation Balloon, 1918–1919, 1919–1922
 A-6 Spherical Balloon, 1929–1942
 A-7 Spherical Balloon, 1929–1942
 C-3 Observation Balloon, 1929–c. 1939
 C-6 Observation Balloon, 1937, 1938–c. 1942
 D-2 Barrage Balloon, 1939

 D-3 Barrage Balloon, 1940–1942
 D-4 Barrage Balloon, 1940–1942
 D-5, Barrage Balloon, 1940–1942
 D-6 Barrage Balloon, 1940–1942
 Ferried various aircraft, 1942–1944
 Boeing EC-135J, 1969–1975
 Boeing E-4, 1974 – Present

References

Notes
 Explanatory notes

 Citations

Bibliography

 
 
 
 
 
 

Military units and formations in Nebraska
001
United States nuclear command and control
Command and control squadrons of the United States Air Force